The Paddington Mystery is a 1925 detective novel by John Rhode, the pen name of the British writer Cecil Street. It marked the first appearance of Lancelot Priestley, who featured in a long-running series of novels during the Golden Age of Detective Fiction. A scientific genius, Priestley is an armchair detective who can solve a mystery without actually visiting the scene of the crime.

Synopsis
After returning one night from a nightclub, Harold Merefield finds a man's dead body lying in his bed. He turns to Doctor Priestley, the father of his former fiancée April.

References

Bibliography
 Evans, Curtis. Masters of the "Humdrum" Mystery: Cecil John Charles Street, Freeman Wills Crofts, Alfred Walter Stewart and the British Detective Novel, 1920-1961. McFarland, 2014.
 Herbert, Rosemary. Whodunit?: A Who's Who in Crime & Mystery Writing. Oxford University Press, 2003.
 James, Russell. Great British Fictional Detectives. Remember When, 21 Apr 2009.

1925 British novels
Novels by Cecil Street
British crime novels
British mystery novels
British thriller novels
British detective novels
Geoffrey Bles books
Novels set in London